Sukumara Kurup (alias Sukumara Pillai) (born as P K Gopalakrishna Kurup) is an Indian fugitive and is one of the most-wanted criminals in the Indian state of Kerala. The subterfuge was soon exposed by the police, who arrested Bhaskara Pillai, Ponnappan and Shahu. However, Kurup absconded from the state in the meantime. Notorious for being India's longest wanted fugitive, Kurup is still missing and untraced since 1984.

Murder of Chacko
Chacko was forcefully intoxicated, poisoned and strangled to death and later the body was burnt inside an Ambassador car at night near Tannimukkam Puncha in Mavelikara. It is assumed that Kurup fled the country after the incident, while two of his three accomplices, driver Ponnappan and brother-in-law Bhaskara Pillai, were sentenced to a life-term imprisonment. His other accomplice, Chinnakkal Shahu, was arrested, but was later made an approver and released. He is the only living eye-witness of the murder of Chacko. According to the police, Sukumara Kurup is still on the list of absconding accused since January 1984.
The Chacko murder case is one of the longest-standing cases in the judicial history of Kerala. In 2018, Chacko's wife, Santhamma, told Bhaskaran that she forgives him and the others (including Kurup) when they met near the St Thomas Malankara Syrian Catholic Church at Chengannur.

The Chacko murder case is one case that caught the media's attention during the mid-2000s, when there were reports on Sukumara Kurup lookalikes from various parts of India. Since Kurup's remains still remain untraced, it's unclear as to whether he's dead or alive. Victims of his crime believe he could be alive and well in a foreign country based on what the investigating officer wrote while closing the case after 12 years of search (1984 to 1996): Kurup had fled from the country with the 72 hours head start he got and with possible help from political allies, cause after the murder came to light he was able to narrowly escape multiple times from the police.

However, it is believed by police that Kurup was found multiple times in India under the alias Joshi, and may have already passed away due to severe cardiac issues. Doctors that had attended him made the prognosis in 1990 that his condition was so bad that after fleeing, he couldn't have survived for long.

In popular culture
NH 47, a Malayalam film based on the Chacko murder was made in 1984 by Baby.

The 2016 Dileep starring movie Pinneyum by director Adoor Gopalakrishnan is loosely adapted from original criminal incident by Sukumara Kurup.

The 2021 crime thriller film, Kurup, directed by Srinath Rajendran, was based on life and aftermath of Chacko murder case committed by Sukumara Kurup. Dulquer Salmaan played the role of Sukumara Kurup (credited as Sudhakara Kurup in the film) with Indrajith Sukumaran essaying the character of the lead investigation officer, S.P. Haridas I.P.S(credited as S.P. Krishnadas I.P.S in the film) and Tovino Thomas as Chacko (credited as Charlie in the film). The film is subject to fictitious themes and representation as well as adding a bit more story into the original case.

See also
List of fugitives from justice who disappeared

References

Crime in Kerala
Fugitives wanted by India
Indian criminals
Possibly living people
1946 births